Dyspessa ulula, the garlic mottled, is a species of moth of the family Cossidae. It is found from central and southern Europe through Russia to central Asia. It is also found in Syria, Iran, Iraq and parts of North Africa.

The larvae feed on Allium species, including Allium flavum, Allium vienale, Allium spaerocephalon and Allium sativum. Development of the larvae takes multiple years.

Features 
Both sexes are of similar sizes. The wingspan is 18–25 mm for females and 19–26 mm for males. The colour of the forewings varies from yellowish grey to yellowish brown. On the forewings, whitish spots of varying degrees can be seen. The apex is relatively pointed and the fringes are piebald. The hind wings are light ochre to yellow-gray or brownish in color. The antennae of the males are briefly double comb-toothed, those of the females are thickened and very short, comb-toothed. Thorax and abdomen are covered by pale gray scales. The females have a slightly longer abdomen with a protruding laying tube.

Subspecies 
D. ulula has three subspecies, namely:
Dyspessa ulula ulula
Dyspessa ulula kasrii Daniel, 1964 (Iran)
Dyspessa ulula nigrita Wagner, 1931 (Asia Minor)

Endangerment 
In Germany, the zwiebelbohrer is only found in a few regions. The species is classified in category 2 on the Red List of Threatened Species.

References

External links

Lepiforum.de 
schmetterlinge-deutschlands.de

Moths described in 1790
Dyspessa
Moths of Europe
Moths of Asia
Moths of Africa
Taxa named by Moritz Balthasar Borkhausen